Matthias Christian Sprengel (24 August 1746, in Rostock – 7 January 1803, in Halle an der Saale) was a German geographer and historian. He was notably the author of works on North American history, the American Revolution and Maratha history.

He studied history at the University of Göttingen as a pupil of August Ludwig von Schlözer. In 1778 he became an associate professor, and during the following year, relocated to the University of Halle as a full professor of history. At Halle he worked closely with Johann Reinhold Forster, who in time, became Sprengel's father-in-law.

From 1800 onward, he was editor of Bibliothek der neuesten und wichtigsten Reisebeschreibungen ("Library of the latest and most important travelogues").

Selected works 
 Vom Ursprung des Negerhandels: Ein Antrittsprogramm, 1779 – From the origin of the slave trade.
 Geschichte der Europäer in Nordamerika, 1782 – History of Europeans in North America.
 Geschichte der Falkland-Inseln, 1781 – History of the Falkland Islands.
 Geschichte und Beschreibung der Philippinischen Inseln, 1782 – History and description of the Philippines.
 Neuester Zustand von Connecticut, 1782 – The recent state of Connecticut.
 Geschichte der Revolution von Nord-Amerika, 1785 – History of the Revolution in North America.
 Geschichte der Maratten, 1786 – History of Maratha empire.
 Geschichte der wichtigsten geographischen Entdeckungen bis zur Ankunft der Portugiesen in Japan 1542 (2nd edition, 1792) – History of the most important geographical discoveries until the arrival of the Portuguese in Japan in 1542.
 Auswahl der besten ausländischen geographischen und statistischen Nachrichten zur Aufklärung der Völker- und Länderkunde (14 volumes, 1784–1800) – Selection of the best foreign geographical and statistical notices for the explanation of geography and ethnography
 Mathias Christian Sprengels Erdbeschreibung von Ostindien, 1802 – Sprengel's geography of East India.

References 

1746 births
1803 deaths
People from Rostock
University of Göttingen alumni
Academic staff of the University of Göttingen
Academic staff of the University of Halle
German geographers
18th-century German historians